Frits Dantuma (born 3 August 1992, in Veenwouden) is a Dutch professional footballer who currently plays as a midfielder for ONS Sneek in the Dutch Topklasse.

Club career
He formerly played for SC Cambuur, FC Emmen, for whom he signed in 2013, and amateur side HHC Hardenberg. He joined ONS Sneek in 2015.

References

External links
 Voetbal International profile 

1992 births
Living people
People from Dantumadiel
Association football midfielders
Dutch footballers
SC Cambuur players
FC Emmen players
HHC Hardenberg players
Eerste Divisie players
Derde Divisie players
ONS Sneek players
Footballers from Friesland